This page discusses the 1973 Canadian television series. For the posthumous book of Robert Louis Stevenson titled In the South Seas, see Robert Louis Stevenson.

In the South Seas is a Canadian travel documentary television series which aired on CBC Television in 1973.

Premise
George Woodcock wrote and hosted this series featuring the life and culture of various Pacific Ocean nations such as British Solomon Islands, Fiji, Gilbert Islands, New Caledonia, New Hebrides, Tonga and Western Samoa.

Woodcock published the 1976 book South Sea Journey which included research seen on this series.

Scheduling
This half-hour series was broadcast on Mondays at 10:00 p.m. (Eastern) from 10 September to 19 November 1973.

References

External links

 History of Canadian Broadcasting

CBC Television original programming
1973 Canadian television series debuts
1973 Canadian television series endings